Charles of Blois-Châtillon (131929 September 1364), nicknamed "the Saint", was the legalist Duke of Brittany from 1341 until his death, via his marriage to Joan, Duchess of Brittany and Countess of Penthièvre, holding the title against the claims of John of Montfort. The cause of his possible canonization was the subject of a good deal of political maneuvering on the part of his cousin, Charles V of France, who endorsed it, and his rival, Montfort, who opposed it. The cause fell dormant after Pope Gregory XI left Avignon in 1376, but was revived in 1894. Charles of Blois was beatified in 1904.

Biography
Charles  was born in Blois, the son of Guy de Châtillon, count of Blois, by Margaret of Valois, a sister of King Philip VI of France. A devout ascetic from an early age, he showed interest in religious books but was forbidden from reading them by his father, as they did not seem appropriate to his position as a knight. As he grew older, Charles took piety to the extreme of mortifying his own flesh. It is said that he placed pebbles in his shoes, slept on straw instead of a bed, confessed every night in fear of sleeping in a state of sin, and wore a cilice under his armor in battle. He was nevertheless an accomplished military leader, who inspired loyalty by his religious fervour.

Marriage
On 4 June 1337 in Paris, he married Joan the Lame, heiress and niece of John III, Duke of Brittany.

Breton War of Succession
Together, Charles and his wife, Joan of Penthièvre, fought the House of Montfort in the Breton War of Succession (1341–1364), with the support of the crown of France. Despite his piety, Charles did not hesitate in ordering the massacre of 1,400 civilians after the siege of Quimper as well as the massacre of thousands after the siege of Guerande. After initial successes, Charles was taken prisoner by the English in 1347. His official captor was Thomas Dagworth. 

He stayed nine years as prisoner in the Kingdom of England. During that time, he used to visit English graveyards, where he prayed and recited Psalm 130, much to the chagrin of his own squire. When Charles asked the squire to take part in the prayer, the younger man refused, saying that the men who were buried at the English graveyards had killed his parents and friends and burned their houses.

Charles was released against a ransom of about half a million écus in 1356. Upon returning to France, he decided to travel barefoot in winter from La Roche-Derrien to Tréguier Cathedral out of devotion to Saint Ivo of Kermartin. When the common people heard of his plan, they placed straw and blankets on the street, but Charles promptly took another way. His feet became so sore that he could not walk for 15 weeks. He then resumed the war against the Montforts. 

Charles was eventually killed in combat during the Battle of Auray in 1364, which with the second treaty of Guerande in 1381 determined the end of the Breton War of Succession as a victory for the Montforts.

Family
By his marriage to Joan the Lame, Countess of Penthièvre, he had five children:
 John I, Count of Penthièvre (1340–1404) and Viscount of Limoges.
 Guy
 Henry (d. 1400)
 Marie of Blois, Duchess of Anjou (1345–1404), Lady of Guise, married in 1360 to Louis I, Duke of Anjou
 Margaret of Blois, Countess of Angoulême, married in 1351 to Charles de la Cerda (d. 1354), the Count of Angoulême and Constable of France.

According to Froissart's Chronicles, Charles also had an illegitimate child, John of Blois, who died in the Battle of Auray. However, considering Charles' extreme piety, historian Johan Huizinga regarded it unlikely that Charles actually had a child born outside marriage and that Jean Froissart was probably mistaken in identifying John as Charles' son.

Veneration
Charles was buried at Guingamp, where the Franciscans actively promoted his unapproved cult as saint and martyr. Such variety of ex votos bedecked his tomb, that in 1368 Duke John IV of Brittany persuaded Pope Urban V to issue a bull directing the Breton bishops to stop this. But the bishops failed to enforce it.

Nonetheless, his family successfully lobbied for his canonization as a Saint of the Roman Catholic church for his devotion to religion. Bending to pressure from Charles V of France, Pope Urban authorized a commission to study the matter. Urban died December 1370 to be succeeded by Pope Gregory XI. The commission held its first meeting in Angers in September 1371, and forwarded its report to Avignon the following January. Gregory appointed three cardinals to review the matter. The Pope returned to Italy in September 1376, arriving in Rome in November 1377; he died the following March. Gregory was succeeded in Avignon by Clement VII, but the documents were probably in Rome with Pope Urban VI. There appears to be no record of further activity regarding Charles' cause for canonization at this time. In 1454, Charles' grandson urged his relatives to continue to advocate for his recognition.

The process was re-opened in 1894, and on 14 December 1904, Charles de Châtillon was beatified as Blessed Charles of Blois. His feast Day is 30 September.

See also
 John of Montfort
 Counts of Blois
 Luis de la Cerda, also known as Louis of Spain, a commander of Charles during the Breton War of Succession 
 Dukes of Brittany family tree
 House of Châtillon
 Olivier IV de Clisson

References

Sources

External links

 
 Treccani.it, l'Enciclopedia italiana
 House of de Châtillon (-sur-Marne), Champagne (Soissonnais),Bourgogne, Ponthieu & Ternois, Genealogy and Heraldry
House of de Nanteuil Le-Haudouin, Genealogy and Heraldry

Brittany, Charles, Duke of
Brittany, Charles, Duke of
14th-century dukes of Brittany
14th-century peers of France
People of the Hundred Years' War
Brittany, Charles, Duke of
House of Châtillon
Medieval Breton saints
Breton beatified people